Wiremu Pātara Te Tuhi (? – 2 July 1910) was a notable New Zealand tribal leader, newspaper editor, warrior and secretary to the maori king. Of Māori descent, he identified with the Waikato iwi. He was born in Waikato, New Zealand.

References

Year of birth missing
1910 deaths
New Zealand military personnel
New Zealand Māori soldiers
New Zealand editors